Ayn al-Arab Subdistrict  is a subdistrict of Ayn al-Arab District in northeastern Aleppo Governorate, northern Syria. The administrative centre is the city of Kobani. At the 2004 census, the subdistrict had a population of 81,424.

Cities, towns and villages

References 

Ayn al-Arab District
Ayn al-Arab